Front Range Community College (FRCC) is a public community college with multiple campuses in Colorado.  It has campuses in Westminster, Longmont, and Fort Collins, as well as centers in Brighton and Loveland. It is the largest community college in Colorado and the most popular transfer institution for the University of Colorado-Boulder, Colorado State University, Metropolitan State University of Denver, and CSU Global.  FRCC traces its heritage to the founding of the State Board for Community Colleges and Occupational Education in 1967, which in 1968 established the North Campus of the Community College of Denver as its first new creation. In 1983 the North Campus was renamed as Front Range Community College and became an independent institution in 1985. In 1988, the Larimer County Voc-Tech Center was incorporated as the Larimer Campus of FRCC. The college is accredited by the Higher Learning Commission.

History

From 1968 to 1977, the college was located in facilities at East 62nd Avenue and Downing Street in Denver. In 1977, the college inaugurated a new building on 112th Avenue in Westminster, Colorado. When it opened, the Westminster Campus building was heated with an innovative solar system of over 4000 flat-plate solar thermal panels making it the largest solar-heated educational building in the world. The solar system operated until the solar panels were removed during a major building remodel in 1996, and now the facilities are heated with conventional methods.

During its first decades, the college principally offered career, vocational and technical training, with certificates and two-year associate degrees in many fields, including accounting, architectural technology, automotive repair, business, dental assisting, electronics, healthcare, machine drafting, machining, nursing, and welding. General studies programs in arts, science, and both general and developmental education were also offered. In 1997, FRCC transferred and began offering its machining program at the Rocky Mountain Manufacturing Academy, which was part of the now defunct Higher Education and Advanced Technology (HEAT) Center at the decommissioned Lowry Air Force Base in Aurora, Colorado. Today the college offers a mix of general academic and transfer courses as well as career and technical education offerings.

FRCC currently maintains campuses in Fort Collins and Longmont, and centers in Brighton and Loveland, in addition to the original Westminster campus and a highly developed online learning program. The college also operates its Precision Machining Program in the Advanced Technology Center in Longmont.

Academics
The college has 29 programs that are guaranteed to transfer to public four-year colleges/universities in Colorado. Its 37 career/technical programs include a variety of business, manufacturing, design, computer-related, and health-care pathways.

FRCC has observatories on each campus.

In 2018, the college awarded 2,002 associate degrees and a further 2,666 certificates. The student body is 57% female and 43% male, with most students studying part-time and pursuing programs in liberal arts and sciences or career/technical fields.

FRCC currently has a student enrollment count of around 27,700.

References

External links
Official website

Colorado Community College System
Education in Adams County, Colorado
Education in Boulder County, Colorado
Education in Larimer County, Colorado
Education in Weld County, Colorado
Westminster, Colorado
Educational institutions established in 1968